Un Cachito de Mí: Grandes Éxitos is the compilation album by Argentine singer-songwriter Diego Torres, it was released on June 15, 2008 through Sony Music.

Track listing

CD 1

 Hasta Cuándo
 Alba
 Qué Será
 Problema
 Se Dejaba Llevar Por Ti
 Sueños (feat. Julieta Venegas)
 Penélope
 Cuando el Mundo Da Vueltas
 Que No Me Pierda
 La Última Noche

CD 2

 Deja de Pedir Perdón
 Tratar de Estar Mejor
 Por la Vereda del Sol
 Dónde Van
 Puedo Decir Que Sí
 Andando
 Abriendo Caminos (feat. Juan Luis Guerra)
 Cantar Hasta Morir
 Una y Mil Veces (feat. Magali Bachor)
 Color Esperanza

2008 compilation albums
Diego Torres compilation albums
Spanish-language compilation albums